Myro is a genus of  araneomorph spiders in the family Toxopidae, and was first described by O. Pickard-Cambridge in 1876. Originally placed with the Cybaeidae, it was moved to the intertidal spiders in 1967, and to the Toxopidae in 2017.

Species
 it contains seven species:
Myro jeanneli Berland, 1947 – Crozet Is.
Myro kerguelenensis O. Pickard-Cambridge, 1876 (type) – Kerguelen, Macquarie Is.
Myro k. crozetensis Enderlein, 1903 – Crozet Is.
Myro maculatus Simon, 1903 – Australia (Tasmania)
Myro marinus (Goyen, 1890) – New Zealand
Myro paucispinosus Berland, 1947 – Marion Is., Crozet Is.
Myro pumilus Ledoux, 1991 – Crozet Is.

References

Araneomorphae genera
Toxopidae